Kazan is one of the largest industrial and financial centres of Russia, and a leading city of the Volga economic region in construction and accumulated investment. Total banking capital of Kazan banks is third in Russia. The main industries of the city are: mechanical engineering, chemical, petrochemical, light and food industries. An innovative economy is represented by the largest IT-park in Russia which is one of the largest of its kind amongst Eastern Europe science parks. Kazan ranks 174th (highest in Russia) in Mercer’s Worldwide Quality of Living Survey.

Macroeconomics

Plant facilities

Several Top-500 Russian companies are headquartered within city boundaries:
TAIF (192,10 bln rub. annual receipt)
Tatenergo (47,13 bln rub.)1
Kazanorgsintez (21,19 bln rub.)
Transtechservice (14,87 bln rub)
Vamin (9,7 bln rub.)

There are 151 large- and middle-scale enterprises in Kazan city, 98 of them are JSCs. Main industries are: machinery construction, chemicals and petrochemicals, light and food industries. Factory shipments in 2008 year total 94,8 bln rub.

Main enterprises of the city:
 Kazanorgsintez
"Kazanorgsintez" JSC produces 38% of Russian polyethylene.  It also produces a large variety of petrochemical and chemical products.
 Kazan Aircraft Production Association
KAPO currently produces the Tu-214 passenger plane and the Tu-160 strategic bomber. There are also plans to start producing Tu-334 regional airliners and Tu-330 freighters.
 Kazan Helicopters
Produces "Mi" helicopters.
 Kazan State Powder Mill
Founded in 1788.
 Kazan optical mechanics plant
 Kazan motors building production association
 "NEFIS-cosmetics" JSC (Kazan chemical complex)
Produces a large variety of cleaning agents
 Kazan brewery
Is a proper of EFES group.
 Kazan medical apparatus plant
 Kazan rubber plant ("KVART" JSC)
 Kazan heat devices plant
 Kazan artificial leather plant

Banks

Largest banks of Kazan city are:
 Ak Bars Bank — net wealth for 01.10.08 — 190 bln rub.
 Tatfondbank — 40 bln rub.
 "Kazansky" bank — 10 bln rub.
 "Spurt" bank — 9,4 bln rub.
 Energobank — 9,0 bln rub.
 Intechbank — 5,6 bln rub.
 "Ipoteka-invest" — 3,6 bln rub.
 "Zarechye"
 Tatecobank
 Tatinvestbank
 Akibank
 BTA-Kazan
 Alfabank

Tourism

A unique combination of historic city and modern megalopolis attracts tourists to Kazan. More than  1,000,000 tourists visited Kazan in 2010.
Kazan Kremlin attracts more than 200,000 tourists per year.
There are more than 83 hotels (5700 accommodations) in the city, including:

Construction

References 

 
Kazan